The 2009 season of the Tonga Major League was the 31st season of top flight association football competition in Tonga. Marist FC won the championship for the first time, ending an 11-year championship winning streak from Lotohaʻapai United.

Standings 
 Marist FC
 Lotohaʻapai United
 Manuka FC
 Ngeleʻia FC
 Ahi'o Ulakai 'Ahau FC

References

Tonga Major League seasons
Tonga
Football